Callistus, Calistus, Callixtus, and Calixtus (all four in Latin) and Kallistos (in Greek; meaning the most beautiful one) may refer to:

Popes and antipopes
 Saint Callixtus I, pope from c. 217 to 222
 Pope Callixtus II, pope from 1119 to 1124
 Antipope Callixtus III, antipope from 1168 to 1178
 Pope Callixtus III, pope from 1455 to 1458

Other persons
 Callistus, a Roman general of the 3rd century more commonly known as Balista
 Patriarch Callistus I of Constantinople
 Patriarch Callistus II of Constantinople
 Callistus Caravario (1903–1930), Italian Roman Catholic priest and missionary
 Callistus Chukwu (born 1990), Nigerian footballer
 Callistus Ndlovu (1936–2019), Zimbabwean politician
 Callistus Valentine Onaga (born 1958), Nigerian Roman Catholic bishop
 Callistus Rubaramira (born 1950), Ugandan Roman Catholic bishop
 Gaius Julius Callistus, a Greek freedman of the Roman emperor Caligula
 Georg Calixtus (1586–1656), German Lutheran theologian
 Kallistos Ware (1934–2022), Metropolitan of Diokleia in Phrygia, an Orthodox assistant bishop in the UK
 Nikephoros Kallistos Xanthopoulos, last of the Greek ecclesiastical historians, flourished c. 1320

Other 
 Callistus (beetle), a ground beetle genus 
 Catacomb of Callixtus

See also
Calixte, French-language variant